The Tournament  is a 2015 French drama film written and directed by Élodie Namer and starring Michelangelo Passaniti and Lou de Laâge.

Cast 
 Michelangelo Passaniti as Cal
 Lou de Laâge as Lou
 Magne-Håvard Brekke as Viktor
 Adam Corbier as Max
 Fabien Libiszewski as Aurélien
 Thomas Solivéres as Mathieu
 Aliocha Schneider as Anthony
 Viktoria Kozlova as Andrea 
 Ana Neborac as Natacha
 Magdalena Korpas as Irina
 Victoire Gonin-Labat as Eleanor

References

External links 
 

2015 films
2015 drama films
2015 in chess
2010s French-language films
2010s English-language films
2010s Hungarian-language films
French drama films
Films about chess
2015 directorial debut films
2015 multilingual films
French multilingual films
2010s French films